Studeny/Studyony (masculine), Studenaya/Studyonaya (feminine), or Studenoye/Studyonoye  (neuter) is the name of several rural localities in Russia:
Studeny, Belgorod Oblast, a khutor in Prokhorovsky District of Belgorod Oblast
Studeny, Krasnoyarsk Krai, a settlement under the administrative jurisdiction of the work settlement of Kuragino in Kuraginsky District of Krasnoyarsk Krai
Studeny, Oryol Oblast, a settlement in Vyshneolshansky Selsoviet of Dolzhansky District of Oryol Oblast
Studeny, Samara Oblast, a settlement in Krasnoyarsky District of Samara Oblast
Studeny, Saratov Oblast, a settlement in Petrovsky District of Saratov Oblast
Studeny, Sverdlovsk Oblast, a settlement under the administrative jurisdiction of the city of Nizhny Tagil, Sverdlovsk Oblast
Studeny, Tula Oblast, a settlement in Alexandrovsky Rural Okrug of Zaoksky District of Tula Oblast
Studeny, Voronezh Oblast, a settlement in Kolenovskoye Rural Settlement of Novokhopyorsky District of Voronezh Oblast
Studenoye, Kaluga Oblast, a village in Baryatinsky District of Kaluga Oblast
Studenoye, Leningrad Oblast, a logging depot settlement in Melnikovskoye Settlement Municipal Formation of Priozersky District of Leningrad Oblast
Studenoye, Novosibirsk Oblast, a selo in Karasuksky District of Novosibirsk Oblast
Studenoye, Orenburg Oblast, a selo in Studenovsky Selsoviet of Ileksky District of Orenburg Oblast
Studenoye, Oryol Oblast, a selo in Vyshneolshansky Selsoviet of Dolzhansky District of Oryol Oblast
Studenoye, Vologda Oblast, a village in Strelensky Selsoviet of Velikoustyugsky District of Vologda Oblast
Studenoye, Voronezh Oblast, a selo in Nashchekinskoye Rural Settlement of Anninsky District of Voronezh Oblast